Ya Ali Gavabar (also Romanized as Yā ʿAlī Gavābar; also known as Aligavaber) is a village in Amlash-e Jonubi Rural District, in the Central District of Amlash County, Gilan Province, Iran. At the 2006 census, its population was 297, in 74 families.

References 

Populated places in Amlash County